The United States Mint has minted over 20 different kinds of coins, of many different sizes. Often, it is difficult for people to get a grasp of what much of the historical coinage looked like, at least in relation to modern circulating coins.  This chart shows all of the coin types, and their sizes, grouped by coins of similar size and by general composition.

Seven distinct types of coin composition have been used over the past 200 years: three base coin alloys, two silver alloys, gold, and in recent years, platinum and palladium. The base metal coins were generally alloys of copper (for 2 cent coins and lower), and copper/nickel (for 3 and 5 cent coins). Copper/nickel composition is also used for all modern "silver" coins.

Notes on the tables:

 Images are close to actual size on a 92-dpi monitor.
 Clad Half Dollars, Silver Half Dollars and Dollars, and Gold Half Eagles and Eagles are still regularly minted as commemorative coins.  Dimes, quarters and half dollars are also struck in 90% silver for special annual collector's sets.
 The silver-colored Susan B. Anthony dollar was replaced with gold-colored Sacagawea dollar in 2000 and Presidential Dollars 2007-2016; though the composition changed, the coin's size and weight remain the same.
 Some variances in coin size and weight occurred over time, especially as the value of silver varied.  In particular, many silver coins changed in the 1870s. The figures cited in the tables are representative of the series, and are generally the latest, or most common, figures for a given coin type.

The largest coin ever minted by the US Mint was the 2019 Apollo 50th anniversary 5ounce silver dollar, weighing 155.517 grams, and 76.2 mm in diameter.

References